Bring You Home is the fourth studio album by Irish singer-songwriter Ronan Keating. It was released by Polydor Records on 5 June 2006. It was his last studio album before he returned to newly reformed Boyzone. The album debuted at number three on the UK Albums Chart.

Background
Three singles were released from the album: "All Over Again" (featuring Kate Rusby), "Iris" (a cover of the Goo Goo Dolls' hit song), and "This I Promise You", which was released as a download-single only. The album also contains the song "To Be Loved", which was originally recorded by Westlife on their 2001 album World of Our Own. However, Keating's uses completely different lyrics for the second verse of the song. This is only one of two songs on the album that were produced by Steve Mac, who originally co-wrote it. The album was primarily produced by Mark Taylor. "Just When I'd Given Up Dreaming" was co-written with American singer/songwriter, Richard Marx. The album has been certified Platinum in Australia, and has sold more than 70,000 copies there. The album has also achieved Gold status in UK, selling more than 100,000 copies.

Track listing
All tracks produced by Mark Taylor; except "To Be Loved" and "Back in the Backseat" produced by Steve Mac.

Notes
The Portuguese version replaces "All Over Again" with a duet version with Rita Guerra.

Charts

Weekly charts

Year-end charts

Certifications

References

2006 albums
Ronan Keating albums
Albums produced by Mark Taylor (music producer)
Albums produced by Steve Mac